Alain Claessens (1947–2004) was a French actor.

1947 births
2004 deaths
French male stage actors
French male film actors